The 2014–15 is the 28th season of División de Honor, the top flight women's water polo in Spain since its inception in 1988.

The season comprises regular season and championship playoff. Regular season started on October 11, 2014 and finished on April 29, 2015. After the regular season, top four teams at standings play championship playoff.

Championship playoff began on May 6 with semifinals to best of three games, with two winners advancing to the Final.

Sabadell Astralpool won its fifth championship title in a row after defeating CN Sant Andreu in the Championship Final series 2–0.

Teams

Regular season standings

Championship playoffs

Semifinals

1st match

2nd match

 Sabadell Astralpool wins series 2–0.

3rd match

 Sant Andreu wins series 2–1.

Final

1st match

2nd match

 Sabadell Astralpool wins championship Final series 2–0.

Individual awards
 Championship MVP:  Maica García, CN Sabadell Astralpool
 Best Goalkeeper:  Laura Ester, CN Sabadell Astralpool
 Top goalscorer:  Maica García, CN Sabadell Astralpool

Relegation playoff
Playoff to be played in two legs. First leg to be played on 9 May and 2nd leg on 16 May. The winner will play in División de Honor Femenina 2015–16 and the loser one in Primera División.

|}

1st match

2nd match

 EW Zaragoza wins 20–16 on aggregate and remained in División de Honor.

Top goalscorers 

(regular season only)

References

See also
 División de Honor de Waterpolo 2014–15

External links
 2014–15 season schedule
 2014–15 season results

División de Honor Femenina de Waterpolo
Seasons in Spanish water polo competitions
Spain
2014 in women's water polo
2015 in women's water polo
2014 in Spanish women's sport
2015 in Spanish women's sport